Cyclopropane fatty acids (CPA) are a subgroup of fatty acids that contain a cyclopropane group. Although they are usually rare, the seed oil from lychee contains nearly 40% CPAs in the form of triglycerides.

Biosynthesis
CPAs are derived from unsaturated fatty acids by cyclopropanation. The methylene donor is a methyl group on S-adenosylmethionine (SAM).  The conversion is catalyzed by cyclopropane-fatty-acyl-phospholipid synthase.  The mechanism is proposed to involve transfer of a CH3+ group from SAM to the alkene, followed by deprotonation of the newly attached methyl group and ring closure.

Cyclopropene fatty acids

Cyclopropene fatty acids are even rarer than CPAs.  The best-known examples are malvalic acid and sterculic acid.  Sterculic acid as its triglyceride is present in sterculia oils and at low levels in kapok seed oil (~12%), cottonseed oil (~1%), and in the seeds of the tree Sterculia foetida (~65-78%). These acids are highly reactive but the cyclopropene ring is destroyed during refining and hydrogenation of the oils. They have attracted interest because they reduce levels of the enzyme stearoyl-CoA 9-desaturase (SCD), which catalyzes the biodesaturation of stearic acid to oleic acid.

At least one review indicates that CPFA are carcinogenic, co-carcinogenic, and have medical and other effects on animals; according to this review, "CPFA in food is dangerous to human health".

References

External links
 

Fatty acids
Cyclopropanes